Caio Matheus da Silva (born 19 February 2004) is a Brazilian professional footballer who plays as a forward for São Paulo.

Career statistics

Club

References

2004 births
Living people
People from Limeira
Footballers from São Paulo (state)
Brazilian footballers
Brazil youth international footballers
Association football forwards
São Paulo FC players